A Quadripartite Agreement is a treaty among four states or four commercial parties, and it may refer to: 

Quadripartite Agreement (1933), signed in Rome on 7 June 1933, by France Britain, Italy and Germany. Also known as Four-Power Pact it was proposed by Mussolini, a reinvigoration of the Locarno Pact.
Quadripartite Agreement (1947) was a secret pact signed by Britain, the United States, Canada, and Australia  as a follow on from World War II cooperation on intelligence  matters.
Quadripartite Agreement (1971) or the Four Power Agreement on Berlin of 3 September 1971 between the United States, the Soviet Union, the United Kingdom and France.
Quadripartite Agreement (1994) on voluntary return of refugees and displaced persons (S/1994/397, annex II), signed in Moscow on 4 April 1994.
Quadripartite Agreement between Argentina, Brazil, the Brazilian-Argentine Agency for Accounting and Control of Nuclear Materials (ABACC), and the International Atomic Energy Agency (IAEA) for the application of nuclear safeguards.

See also
Congress of Aix-la-Chapelle (1818), a meeting of the four allied powers Britain, Austria, Prussia and Russia to decide the question of the withdrawal of the army of occupation from France and the nature of the modifications to be introduced in consequence into the relations of the four powers towards each other, and collectively towards France.
Four Power (disambiguation)